Radawczyk Drugi  is a village in the administrative district of Gmina Konopnica, within Lublin County, Lublin Voivodeship, in eastern Poland.

The village has a population of 200.

References

Villages in Lublin County